Rudboneh Rural District is a rural district (dehestan) in Rudboneh District, Lahijan County, Gilan Province, Iran. At the 2006 census, its population was 11,893, in 3,519 families. The rural district has 19 villages.

References 

Rural Districts of Gilan Province
Lahijan County